The 2021 Meath Intermediate Football Championship is the 95th edition of the Meath GAA's premier club Gaelic football tournament for Intermediate graded teams in County Meath, Ireland. The tournament consists of 20 teams and starts with a group stage before progressing to a knock out stage. The winner will represent Meath in the Leinster Intermediate Club Football Championship.

Ballinabrackey were the 2020 Meath Intermediate Football Champions after they defeated Trim in the final. As a result, they will compete in the 2021 Meath Senior Football Championship.

Nobber were relegated from the Senior Football Championship in 2020 after just one season in the Senior Football Championship.
Ballivor returned to the I.F.C. for the first time since 2017 after beating St. Vincent's in the 2020 Meath Junior Football Championship final.
Castletown were relegated to the 2021 Meath Junior Football Championship. They will play at the junior grade for the first time in their history.

The draw for the group stages of the championship took place on 20 June 2021 with the games commencing on 13 August 2021.

Championship Structure
The championship will consist of five groups with each containing four teams. The top two teams in each group will progress to the knockout stages while the bottom team in each group will contest the relegation playoffs.

Team changes
The following teams have changed division since the 2020 championship season.

From I.F.C.
Promoted to 2021 S.F.C.
 Ballinabrackey - (Intermediate Champions)

Relegated to 2021 Meath Junior Football Championship
 Castletown

To I.F.C.
Relegated from 2020 S.F.C.
 NobberPromoted from 2020 J.F.C. Ballivor - (Junior 'A' Champions)

Participating teams
The teams taking part in the 2021 Meath Intermediate Football Championship are:

Group stage 

There are five groups of four teams called Group A, B, C, D and E. The 1st placed teams in each group along with the 2nd placed team in group A automatically qualify for the quarter finals. The 2nd placed teams in Groups B, C, D & E qualify for the preliminary Quarter-Finals with the winners progressing to the quarter finals.

Three teams will be relegated from IFC to JFC in both 2021 and 2022 in order to bring the IFC from 20 teams to 16 teams. In 2021, the last placed teams in each group (five teams in total) will be entered into an open draw to contest the relegation playoffs as follows: 
 1 v 2
 Winner of 1v2 will play 3
 4 v 5

The loser of each playoff game will be relegated to the 2022 JFC while two teams will preserve their intermediate status.Tiebreakers:If two or more teams were equal on points on completion of the group matches, the following tie-breaking criteria would be applied:

All Football Championships and Leagues shall be run on a combination of a league and knockout basis under Rule 6.21 T.O. Where teams finish equal with points for qualification or relegation process for concluding stages, the positioning shall be decided as follows;

 (i) Where three teams are involved - the outcome of the meetings of the three teams in their previous games in the competition. If three teams finish level on points for three places and one team has beaten the other two teams that team qualifies in first place and other places are determined by the specified order. If there are two positions and one team has beaten the other two teams that team qualifies and the second place is determined by the specified order. If there is one position and one team has beaten the other two team that team qualifies;
 (ii) Where two teams are involved - the outcome of the meeting of the two teams in the previous game in the competition;
 (iii) Scoring Difference;
 (iv) Highest total scores for;
 (v) A play-off.

Group ARound 1 Nobber 1-7, 1-10 Blackhall Gaels, Trim, 13/8/2021
 St. Patrick's 2-9, 2-9 Bective, Duleek, 15/8/2021Round 2 Blackhall Gaels 0-12, 0-9 St. Patrick's, Kilbride, 28/8/2021
 Bective 1-8, 2-12 Nobber, Bective, 28/8/2021Round 3 Bective 1-11, 1-9 Blackhall Gaels, Summerhill, 12/9/2021
 Nobber 3-15, 1-11 St. Patrick's, Seneschalstown, 12/9/2021

Group BRound 1 Clann na nGael 3-14, 0-14 Longwood, Clonard, 24/8/2021
 Trim 2-18, 0-7 Moylagh, Cortown, 15/8/2021,Round 2 Longwood 1-11, 2-16 Trim, Boardsmill, 29/8/2021
 Moylagh 1-6, 1-7 Clann na nGael, Ballinlough, 29/8/2021Round 3 Moylagh 1-10, 2-15 Longwood, Kildalkey, 12/9/2021
 Clann na nGael 2-8, 3-11 Trim, Páirc Tailteann, 12/9/2021

Group CRound 1 Walterstown 0-17, 1-9 Syddan, Castletown, 13/8/2021
 Oldcastle 2-10, 1-12 Meath Hill, Pairc Tailteann, 15/8/2021Round 2 Oldcastle 3-14, 1-9 Syddan, Moynalty, 27/8/2021
 Walterstown 2-16, 1-13 Meath Hill, Nobber, 28/8/2021Round 3 Oldcastle 2-13, 1-16 Walterstown, Kilmainham, 12/9/2021
 Syddan 3-10, 2-16 Meath Hill, Drumconrath, 12/9/2021

Group DRound 1 Ballivor 2-20, 1-14 Drumbaragh, Bohermeen, 15/8/2021
 Duleek/Bellewstown 6-16, 0-12 Kilmainham, Ardcath, 19/8/2021Round 2 Drumbaragh 3-10, 2-13 Kilmainham, Páirc Tailteann, 28/8/2021
 Duleek/Bellewstown 2-14, 0-13 Ballivor, Bective, 29/8/2021Round 3 Duleek/Bellewstown 2-20, 2-10 Drumbaragh, Simonstown, 10/9/2021
 Ballivor -vs- Kilmainham, Cortown, 10/9/2021

Group ERound 1 Rathkenny 0-13, 1-5 Dunderry, Walterstown, 14/8/2021
 St. Michael's 0-11, 0-10 Ballinlough, Martry, 15/8/2021 Round 2 Ballinlough 1-10, 1-13 Rathkenny, Kilmainhamwood, 28/8/2021
 Dunderry 1-16, 0-8 St. Michael's, Kilmainham, 29/8/2021Round 3 Dunderry 2-13, 1-11 Ballinlough, Bohermeen, 12/9/2021
 St. Michael's 0-7, 2-15 Rathkenny''', Nobber, 12/9/2021

Knock-Out Stage
The 1st placed teams each group and the 2nd placed team in Group A qualify for the quarter-finals. The 2nd places teams in Groups B, C, D and E qualify for the preliminary Quarter-Finals with the winners progressing to the quarter-finals

Preliminary quarter-finals

Quarter-finals

Semi-finals

Final

Relegation play-off
Three teams were relegated from the 2021 IFC. The 4th placed teams in each group contested the relegation playoffs. Each team was entered into an open draw which consists of three games. The loser of each game was relegated to the 2022 JFC while the winners of Relegation play-offs 2 & 3 preserved their intermediate status.

Relegation play-off Matches

References

External links

Meath IFC
Meath Intermediate Football Championship
Meath Intermediate Football Championship